The 2022 San Francisco Board of Supervisors elections were held on November 8, 2022. Five of the eleven seats on the San Francisco Board of Supervisors were up for election. The election was conducted with ranked-choice voting.

Results

District 2 
Incumbent Supervisor Catherine Stefani sought reelection.

District 4 
Incumbent Supervisor Gordon Mar sought reelection.

District 6 
Incumbent Supervisor Matt Dorsey sought reelection. Dorsey was appointed to the seat in 2022 by Mayor London Breed to fill the remainder of Matt Haney's term after he was elected to the California State Assembly.

District 8 
Incumbent Supervisor Rafael Mandelman sought reelection.

District 10 
Incumbent Supervisor Shamann Walton sought reelection.

References

External links 

San Francisco Board of Supervisors
San Francisco Board of Supervisors
Board of Supervisors 2022
2022 in San Francisco